El Sayed Badreya is an Egyptian-American actor. He was born on February 4, 1957, in Port Said, Egypt.

He has had many roles in movies and television. He appeared in AmericanEast, Iron Man, Cargo, and The Dictator.  He also provided motion capture and voice work for the pirate Rameses in Uncharted 3: Drake's Deception.

Filmography

References

External links
 

1957 births
Living people
Egyptian male film actors
Egyptian male television actors
Actors from Port Said